Barry Gerard Brown Jr. (born December 21, 1996) is an American professional basketball player for the New Zealand Breakers of the Australian National Basketball League (NBL). He played college basketball for the Kansas State Wildcats.

Early life
Brown's father, Barry Brown Sr, was a star basketball player at Jacksonville and is now a middle school principal. Brown Jr. began playing basketball at a young age and was competing in recreational tournaments at the age of five. By the age of seven, he was playing in older age brackets in Amateur Athletic Union tournaments. Growing up, Brown also excelled at football.

High school career
Brown attended Gibbs High School, where he was coached by Larry Murphy. He scored 36 points in the regional final as a senior to lead Gibbs to a win over Golden Gate. Brown was a three-star recruit and committed to Kansas State over offers from Florida Gulf Coast, Providence, Texas A&M and Wichita State.

College career
Brown was named to the Big 12 All-Newcomer Team at the conclusion of his freshman season at Kansas State. As a sophomore, he averaged 11.7 points per game and set a Kansas State single-season record for steals with 82 takeaways. Brown scored a career-high 38 points in an 86–82 victory over Oklahoma State on January 9, 2018. After his junior season, Brown earned second-team All-Big 12 accolades as well as being named to the league's defensive team. He scored 18 points in both of the first two games of the NCAA Tournament, against Creighton and UMBC, and capably guarded the opposing team's best player. In the Sweet 16 of the NCAA Tournament, he scored 13 points in a 61–58 win over Kentucky including the decisive layup in the waning seconds. Brown averaged 15.9 points, 3.2 rebounds and 3.1 assists per game as a junior in leading Kansas State to 25 wins and an Elite Eight appearance. Following the season, he declared for the 2018 NBA draft but did not hire an agent to preserve his eligibility and ultimately opted to return to school.

Professional career

Iowa Wolves (2019–2020)
After going undrafted in the 2019 NBA draft, Brown spent Summer League and pre-season with the Minnesota Timberwolves. He then joined the Iowa Wolves of the NBA G League for the 2019–20 season. On February 24, 2020, Brown contributed 35 points, five rebounds and three assists in a 152–148 loss to the South Bay Lakers.

Riesen Ludwigsburg (2020–2021) 
On July 8, 2020, Brown signed with MHP Riesen Ludwigsburg of the Basketball Bundesliga (BBL).

Beijing Ducks (2022)
In January 2022, Brown joined the Beijing Ducks of the Chinese Basketball Association.

New Zealand Breakers (2022–present)
On August 30, 2022, Brown signed with the New Zealand Breakers for the 2022–23 NBL season.

Career statistics

College

|-
| style="text-align:left;"| 2015–16
| style="text-align:left;"| Kansas State
| 33 || 11 || 25.8 || .348 || .336 || .635 || 2.8 || 1.5 || 1.2 || .1 || 8.6
|-
| style="text-align:left;"| 2016–17 
| style="text-align:left;"| Kansas State
| 35 || 35 || 32.7 || .412 || .326 || .615 || 3.2 || 2.4 || 2.3 || .1 || 11.7
|-
| style="text-align:left;"| 2017–18 
| style="text-align:left;"| Kansas State 
| 37 || 37 || 34.7 || .448 || .318 || .772 || 3.1 || 3.2 || 1.8 || .1 || 15.9
|-
| style="text-align:left;"| 2018–19
| style="text-align:left;"| Kansas State
| 34 || 34 || 35.0 || .433 || .298 || .710 || 4.1 || 2.8 || 1.9 || .1 || 14.6
|- class="sortbottom"
| style="text-align:center;" colspan="2"| Career
| 139 || 117 || 32.2 || .417 || .319 || .701 || 3.3 || 2.5 || 1.8 || .1 || 12.8

Basketball-Bundesliga

Regular season 

|-
| style="text-align:left;"| 2020–21
| style="text-align:left;"| Ludwigsburg
| 28 || 3 || 18.8 || .434 || .351 || .787 || 2.3 || 1.7 || .8 || .1 || 12.9

Playoffs 

|-
| style="text-align:left;"| 2020–21
| style="text-align:left;"| Ludwigsburg
| 5 || 0 || 16.7 || .389 || .28 || .9 || 1.2 || 1.0 || .6 || 0 || 11.6

CBA

Regular season 

|-
| style="text-align:left;"| 2021–22
| style="text-align:left;"| Beijing Ducks
| 5 || 2 || 18.4 || .429 || .333 || .769 || 3.2 || 2.0 || .8 || .6 || 17.4

Source: basketball-stats.de (Stand: 29. March 2022)

References

External links
Kansas State Wildcats bio
Barry Brown profile at basketball-stats.de

1996 births
Living people
American expatriate basketball people in China
American expatriate basketball people in Germany
American expatriate basketball people in New Zealand
American men's basketball players
Basketball players from St. Petersburg, Florida
Beijing Ducks players
Iowa Wolves players
Kansas State Wildcats men's basketball players
New Zealand Breakers players
Riesen Ludwigsburg players
Shooting guards